Arthur Townsend (7 April 1883 – 1937) was a British long-distance runner. He competed in the marathon at the 1912 Summer Olympics.

References

1883 births
1937 deaths
Athletes (track and field) at the 1912 Summer Olympics
British male long-distance runners
British male marathon runners
Olympic athletes of Great Britain
People from Clacton-on-Sea